Calliostoma thrincoma is a species of sea snail, a marine gastropod mollusk in the family Calliostomatidae.

Description
The height of this conical-pyramidal, imperforate shell attains 11 mm. It is highly sculptured and conspicuously keeled around every whorl just above the suture. The body whorl at the periphery is bicarinate. The aperture is square-shaped.

Distribution
This species occurs in the Gulf of Oman.

References

External links

thrincoma
Gastropods described in 1903